Minax may refer to:

 Minax, a brand name of the cardiovascular drug metoprolol
 Minax (Ultima), the Ultima game character

Species names 
 Austracantha minax, an Australian spider
 Bulbophyllum minax, a type of orchid
 Dracula minax, a type of orchid
 Galeandra minax, a type of orchid